Sam Jasper (born 6 February 1986) is a New Zealand footballer who plays as centre-back or midfielder. He has played for New Zealand Knights in the A-League. He has played for the New Zealand U16, U17 and U-20's teams.

After playing for Albany United in 2022, it was announced Jasper would be the assistant coach for Mount Albert-Ponsonby in the 2023 NRFL Division 1.

References

Living people
1986 births
New Zealand association footballers
Association footballers from Auckland
Association football central defenders
Association football midfielders
A-League Men players
New Zealand Knights FC players
Waitakere United players
Canterbury United players